Sébastien Canonne, M.O.F. (born 1968) is a French master pastry chef and co-founder of the French Pastry School in Chicago. In 2004, he earned the elite title of Meilleur Ouvrier de France, and in 2015 was named a Knight by the French government in the National Order of the Legion of Honour.

Early life and education
Canonne was born and raised in Normandy, France. His training began at the Culinary School of Rouen in Normandy when he was 15. He had a culinary apprenticeship at the School of Hospitality and Hotel Management in Rouen, Normandy, followed by a pastry apprenticeship under chef Gaston Lenôtre.

Career

Restaurants and hotels
Canonne has worked at a variety of fine-dining restaurants and luxury hotels, including three-star Michelin restaurants; the Pré Catelan in Paris and the Côte Saint Jacques in Burgundy, France; the Beau-Rivage Palace in Geneva; the Euler Palace Hotel in Basel, Switzerland; and the Palais de l'Elysée in Paris for French president François Mitterrand. He moved to the United States in 1991, becoming the executive pastry chef at the Ritz-Carlton Hotel in Chicago.

In 2004, Canonne earned the title of Meilleur Ouvrier de France, the highest distinction for an artisan in France. The title is determined through a contest held once every three to four years. He was the first pastry chef living in the United States to be awarded the honor. In 2015, Canonne was knighted in the Order of the Legion of Honour, recognizing outstanding merit and contributions to French culture.

French Pastry School

The French Pastry School was founded in Chicago, Illinois, in 1995 by Canonne and fellow master pastry chef Jacquy Pfeiffer. The vocational secondary school was founded to teach traditional French pastry-making. It is the only school in the United States dedicated entirely to the art of pastry.

Film and television appearances
Canonne is featured in the 2009 documentary film Kings of Pastry, directed by D.A. Pennebaker and Chris Hegedus, which documented Jacquy Pfeiffer's attempt to earn the title of Meilleur Ouvrier de France. Canonne served as Pfeiffer's coach in the competition.

Canonne was a mentor and judge on season 2 of Top Chef: Just Desserts in 2011.

Honors and awards
 Taittinger Champagne Pastry Chef of the Year in America, 1995
 US National Pastry Cup Champion, 1996
 Top Ten Pastry Chef in America, Dessert Professionals magazine, 1996
 Medal of Excellence by the Vatel Club of Chicago, 1997
 Coupe du Monde de la Patisserie, US team, silver medal, 1997
 Won the National Pastry Championship in Beaver Creek, Colorado, 2000
 Inducted into the Académie Culinaire de France, 2000
 Jean Banchet Award of Excellence for Best Culinary School in America, 2001
 Awarded Meilleur Ouvrier de France, 2004
 Pastry Chef of the Year, World Pastry Forum, Las Vegas, Nevada, 2004
 40 Under 40, Crain's Chicago Business, 2007
 Named Knight by the Académie Culinaire de France in the World Order of the Académie Culinaire de France, 2009
 Named Knight by the French Government in the Order of Academic Palms, 2012
 Awarded the Medal of the Centennial Honor by the Académie Culinaire de France, 2013
 Named Knight by the French Government in the National Order of the Legion of Honour, 2015
 Dessert Professional Hall of Fame Inductee, 2015

References

External links
 Biography at French Pastry School

1968 births
Living people
Pastry chefs
French chefs
Founders of schools in the United States
Businesspeople from Rouen
People from Chicago
Chevaliers of the Légion d'honneur
Educators from Illinois